AMD Excavator Family 15h is a microarchitecture developed by AMD to succeed Steamroller Family 15h for use in AMD APU processors and normal CPUs. On October 12, 2011, AMD revealed Excavator to be the code name for the fourth-generation Bulldozer-derived core.

The Excavator-based APU for mainstream applications is called Carrizo and was released in 2015.
The Carrizo APU is designed to be HSA 1.0 compliant.
An Excavator-based APU and CPU variant named Toronto for server and enterprise markets was also produced.

Excavator was the final revision of the "Bulldozer" family, with two new microarchitectures replacing Excavator a year later.
Excavator was succeeded by the x86-64 Zen architecture in early 2017.

Architecture
Excavator added hardware support for new instructions such as AVX2, BMI2 and RDRAND.
Excavator is designed using High Density (aka "Thin") Libraries normally used for GPUs to reduce electric energy consumption and die size, delivering a 30 percent increase in efficient energy use. Excavator can process up to 15% more instructions per clock compared to AMD's previous core Steamroller.

Features and ASICs

Processors

APU lines

There are three APU lines announced or released:

 Budget and mainstream markets (desktop and mobile): Carrizo APU
 The Carrizo mobile APUs were launched in 2015 based on Excavator x86 cores and featuring Heterogeneous System Architecture for integrated task sharing between CPUs and GPUs, which allows a GPU to perform compute functions, which is claimed provide greater performance increases than shrinking the feature size alone.
Carrizo desktop APUs were launched in 2018. The mainstream product (A8-7680) has 4 Excavator cores and a GPU based on GCN1.2 architecture. Also, an entry-level APU (A6-7480) with 2 Excavator cores is also launched.
 Budget and mainstream markets (desktop and mobile): Bristol Ridge, and Stoney Ridge (for entry level notebooks), APUs
 Bristol Ridge APUs utilize socket AM4 and DDR4 RAM
 Bristol Ridge APUs have up to 4 Excavator CPU cores and up to 8 3rd generation GCN GPU cores
 Up to a 20% CPU performance increase over Carrizo
 TDP of 15W to 65W, 15–35W for mobile
 Enterprise and server markets:  Toronto APU
 The Toronto APU for server and enterprise markets featured four x86 Excavator CPU core modules and Volcanic Islands integrated GPU core.
 The Excavator  cores has a greater advantage with IPC than Steamroller. The improvement is 4–15%.
 Support for HSA/hUMA, DDR3/DDR4, PCIe 3.0, GCN 1.2
 The Toronto APU was available in BGA and SoC variants. The SoC variant had the southbridge on the same die as the APU to save space and power and to optimize workloads.
 A complete system with a Toronto APU would have a maximum power usage of 70 W.

CPU Desktop lines
There are no CPUs Steamroller (3rd gen Bulldozer) or Excavator (4th gen Bulldozer) architectures on high-end desktop platforms.

Excavator CPU for Desktop announced on 2nd Feb 2016, named Athlon X4 845. In 2017, three more desktop CPUs (Athlon X4 9x0) were launched. They come in Socket AM4, with a TDP of 65W. In fact, they are APUs with their graphics cores disabled.

Server lines

The AMD Opteron roadmaps for 2015 show the Excavator-based Toronto APU and Toronto CPU intended for 1 Processor (1P) cluster applications:
 For 1P Web and Enterprise Services Clusters: 
 Toronto CPU – quad-core x86 Excavator architecture 
 plans for Cambridge CPU – 64-bit AArch64 core 
 For 1P Compute and Media Clusters: 
 Toronto APU – quad-core x86 Excavator architecture 
 For 2P/4P Servers:
 Warsaw CPU – 12/16 core x86 Piledriver (2nd gen Bulldozer) (Opteron 6338P and 6370P)
 no plans for Steamroller (3rd gen Bulldozer) or Excavator (4th gen Bulldozer) architectures on high-end multi-processor platforms

References

AMD x86 microprocessors
AMD microarchitectures
X86 microarchitectures